Grand Supreme Blood Court are a Dutch death metal band from Twente, Overijssel. Their first studio album, Bow Down Before the Blood Court, was released through Century Media Records on 12 November 2012. They are currently working on their second album for a mid-to-late 2017 release., however, as of April 2018, its actual release window is unknown.

Band members
Current
 Bob Bagchus (Grand Magistrate Bagchus) - drums (2009–present)
 Eric Daniels (Grand Judge Daniels) - guitars (2009–present)
 Alwin Zuur (Grand Registrar Zuur) - guitars (2009–present)
 Martin van Drunen (Grand Prosecutor van Drunen) - Vocals (2009–present)
 Remco Kreft (Grand Executioner Kreft) - bass (2013–present)

Former
 Theo van Eekelen (Grand Executioner van Eekelen) - bass (2009-2013)

Discography

Studio albums
Bow Down Before the Blood Court (2012)

References

Dutch death metal musical groups
Musical quintets
Musical groups established in 2009